Piotr Krawczyk (born 29 December 1994) is a Polish professional footballer who plays as a forward for Polish club Górnik Zabrze.

Career
He signed with Górnik Zabrze on 29 June 2019, earning his first top-flight contract after helping Legionovia Legionowo earn promotion out of the III liga during the 2018–19 season. Krawczyk made his Ekstraklasa debut in August 2019, coming off the bench against Jagiellonia Białystok.

References

Living people
1994 births
Polish footballers
People from Siedlce
Association football forwards
MKP Pogoń Siedlce players
Świt Nowy Dwór Mazowiecki players
Legionovia Legionowo players
Górnik Zabrze players
III liga players
II liga players
I liga players
Ekstraklasa players